The radial groove (also known as the musculospiral groove, radial sulcus, or spiral groove) is a broad but shallow oblique depression for the radial nerve and deep brachial artery. It is located on the center of the lateral border of the humerus bone. Although it provides protection to the radial nerve, it is often involved in compressions on the nerve (due to external pressure due to surgery) that can cause radial nerve palsy.

See also
 Intertubercular groove
 Triceps brachii muscle

Additional images

References

Bibliography 

Humerus